The Grand Prix Královéhradeckého kraje is a one-day cycling race held annually since 2012 in the Czech Republic. It is part of the UCI Europe Tour in category 1.2.

Winners

References

Cycle races in the Czech Republic
Recurring sporting events established in 2012
2012 establishments in the Czech Republic
UCI Europe Tour races
Hradec Králové Region